was a Japanese modern pentathlete. He competed at the 1964 Summer Olympics.

References

External links
 

1932 births
2016 deaths
Japanese male modern pentathletes
Olympic modern pentathletes of Japan
Modern pentathletes at the 1964 Summer Olympics